Marter may refer to:

Places
Marter, Ontario, an unincorporated community in Timiskaming District, Ontario, Canada
Marter Township, Ontario, an unincorporated geographic township in Timiskaming District

People with the surname
Ian Marter, actor
George Frederick Marter, politician

See also
Martyr